Michael Fernandes (born in 1944) is a Canadian experimental artist and art educator based in Halifax, Nova Scotia. His work uses familiar, even banal materials to ask the viewer to confront the boundary between daily life and art.

Early life 
Fernandes was born in Trinidad. He came to Canada to art school in Montreal in the 1960s.

Career 
Initially a painter, Fernandes turned to installation and multimedia to create situations that actively solicit participation from the viewer. Fernandes' texts and interventions explore this intersection of private life with public space.

Fluxus suggested that everyday life should not be excluded from art. It encouraged a direct approach to creating work using the minimum amount of means required. Fernandes extends this approach to use everyday objects and experiences to provoke the viewer to make connections between the installation/performance and the spaces of the viewer's own life. It deliberately leaves room for the viewer to find their own approach to understanding the work, which can be uncomfortable for some.

His approach has been compared to that of Jimmie Durham, David Medalla and David Hammons—all use wit and humour to illuminate attitudes and pre-conceptions based on ethnicity or race.

Fernandes has little interest in preserving objects for posterity or in meeting the viewer's expectations. He is more concerned with an 'ephemeral expressive situation'. The challenge to the viewer is to return from Fernandes' work to experience the artistic moment in the viewer's own life.

He is an instructor in intermedia at NSCAD University.

Exhibitions
He has exhibited extensively nationally, notably at the Blackwood Gallery, Mercer Union, The Power Plant, and YYZ (Toronto, ON); C.I.A.C. (Montreal Biennale); Articule, and Mai, (Montreal, QB), Dunlop Art Gallery (Regina, SK); The National Gallery of Canada, and Saw Gallery (Ottawa, ON); Art Gallery of Nova Scotia, Eye Level Gallery, and Mount Saint Vincent Art Gallery (Halifax, NS); and internationally at P.S.1 (New York, NY); Art Public Calaf (Barcelona, Spain); In The Context of Art Biennale (Warsaw, Poland). His work was included in Traffic: Conceptual Art in Canada 1965-1980, the nationally touring exhibition.

Awards
Governor General's Award in Visual and Media Arts (2020)

References

Further reading 
Régimbal, Christopher, "Whose life are we talking about anyway? Michael Fernandes' One potato, two potato...it's your life...", Fuse Magazine, 2008, 31, 44-46.
Cronin, Ray, "Who, who, who is Michael Fernandes?" C International Contemporary Art (28 July 2005)
Horne, Stephen, "The Everyday Escapes," Third Text, winter 1997-98
Horne, Stephen, "The Everyday Escapes," Abandon Building, 11 Press, Montreal 2007
Michael Fernandes: Room of Fears and Fixing Room, MSVU Art Gallery , 18 March - 14 May 2006.
Wark, Jayne and Peter Dykhuis, Michael Fernandes: Room of Fears, Art Gallery Mount Saint Vincent University (09/2006) 72 pp 23 ill. 5 x .5 in 1-894518-34-9 

Canadian performance artists
Living people
Academic staff of NSCAD University
Canadian conceptual artists
1944 births
Governor General's Award in Visual and Media Arts winners